Mario Trebbi (9 September 1939 – 14 August 2018) was an Italian football player and coach who played as a defender.

Club career
Trebbi played 10 seasons (157 games, 1 goal) in the Italian Serie A for A.C. Milan and A.C. Torino.

International career
Trebbi earned 2 caps for the Italy national football team and represented Italy at the 1960 Summer Olympics.

References

External links
 

1939 births
2018 deaths
People from Sesto San Giovanni
Italian footballers
Italy international footballers
Serie A players
A.C. Milan players
Torino F.C. players
A.C. Monza players
Footballers at the 1960 Summer Olympics
Olympic footballers of Italy
Italian football managers
U.S. Alessandria Calcio 1912 managers
A.S. Siracusa managers
Association football defenders
UEFA Champions League winning players
Footballers from Lombardy
Sportspeople from the Metropolitan City of Milan